Campotosto  is a comune and town in the province of L'Aquila, in the Abruzzo region of central Italy. Olympian Mariano Antonelli was born here.

Geography
Campotosto is located in the northern part of the province of L'Aquila, south of the border with Lazio, and west of the province of Teramo. It is located in Gran Sasso e Monti della Laga National Park. The town has become famous in Italy for its lake, which is the biggest Italian man-made lake.

Accessibility 
The town is served by Italian State Highway 80, a trunk road that connects L'Aquila with Giulianova (TE).
There are also secondary roads that connect Campotosto with Amatrice, Montereale, Aringo and Capitignano.

Climate
The town has a typical Alpine climate, partially mitigated by the nearby lake.

Cuisine
The town is famous for the production of Mortadella di Campotosto.

References

Cities and towns in Abruzzo